Luiz Fernando Uva (born February 18, 1977) is a race car driver born in Brazil. He competed in South American Formula Three in 1998 and 2000. He placed 4th in 2000 with 1 win. He previously raced in Formula Opel Euroseries (1995) and Brazilian Formula Chevrolet (1994).

See also
 Formula 3 Sudamericana drivers
 Brazilian Formula Three Championship

References

External links

Brazilian racing drivers
Formula 3 Sudamericana drivers
Living people
1977 births